Thaleischweiler-Fröschen is a former Verbandsgemeinde ("collective municipality") in the Südwestpfalz district, in Rhineland-Palatinate, Germany. The seat of the municipality was in Thaleischweiler-Fröschen. On 1 July 2014 it merged into the new Verbandsgemeinde Thaleischweiler-Wallhalben.

The Verbandsgemeinde Thaleischweiler-Fröschen consisted of the following Ortsgemeinden ("local municipalities"):

 Höheischweiler
 Höhfröschen
 Maßweiler 
 Nünschweiler
 Petersberg 
 Reifenberg 
 Rieschweiler-Mühlbach 
 Thaleischweiler-Fröschen

Former Verbandsgemeinden in Rhineland-Palatinate